Here is a list of terms referring to an average person. Many are used as placeholder names.

Unsorted
Everyman
T.C. Mits
Average Joe
Reasonable person
Standard person
Joe Blow
Normie

By culture

Arab World
Fulan (male: فلان) Fulana (female: فلانة)

Australia

 Old mate
 Man on the Bondi tram (in legal context in New South Wales)

Austria

 Hans Meier / Maier / Mayer
 Herr und Frau Österreicher (Mr and Mrs Austrian)

Brazil

 João or Joãozinho, Maria ou Mariazinha
 "Zé Ninguém" ( "Joe Nobody" ) and similars ("Zé Arruela" meaning "Joe Washer" as an offense).
 "Fulano" or "Fulano de tal"

Denmark 

 Hr. og Fru Danmark (Mr. and Mrs. Denmark)

Finland
Matti Meikäläinen (male, literally "our Matti"), Maija Meikäläinen (female, literally "our Maija")

France
 Very popular names (similar to John/Jane Doe): Jean Dupont, Paul Martin, M./Mme Durand, M./Mme Martin, etc.;
 Usable as a common word: Pierre-Paul-Jacques (with the meaning of "Someone");
 Random people (similar to Average John/Jane): Monsieur/Madame Tout-le-monde, (M./Mme) Untel/Unetelle (Mr/Mrs NoName), Madame Michu (only female), (M./Mme) Tartempion (familiar and little satirical);
 Other:
 (M./Mme) Machin/Machine (familiar terms, used when one does not take the pain to find another term);
 (Un) Gazier originally, a man who worked in gas transport; nowadays, it is a familiar term to tell "Someone" (mostly for a man, this term is rare for women, and in such a case, the correct orthography is "Gazière").
See also :fr:wikt:Tartempion#Synonymes

Germany
 Max Mustermann (Erika for female)
 Otto Normalverbraucher (Otto Average Consumer)
 Hein Blöd
 Lieschen Müller

Hungary 
 Gipsz Jakab

Israel 
 Israel Israeli
 Ploni and Almoni

Italy
 Mario Rossi
 Pinco Pallino
 Tal dei Tali
 Signor Nessuno
 Uomo medio
 Cittadino qualunque
 "Tizio, Caio e Sempronio" equivalent to "Tom, Dick and Harry"

Japan 
  (male)
  (female)
  (anonymous)

Malaysia 

 Cik Kiah (uncle Kiah), a derivative of the name Makcik Kiah (auntie Kiah), a name made up by PM Tan Sri Muhyiddin to illustrate an average Malaysian: a Pisang goreng seller earning the median rural income.

The Netherlands
 Jan Modaal

Norway

 wikt:Ola/Kari Normann

Philippines 
Juan dela Cruz (male), María dela Cruz or Juana dela Cruz (female)

Poland
Jan Kowalski (male), Anna Kowalska (female), the second most common Polish surname.
For a broader representation of average Poles "Kowalski" may be grouped with some other common surnames, such as Nowak (the most common Polish surname), Malinowski, or  Wiśniewski: "Imagine our neighbors, the Kowalskis or Nowaks, who earn PLN 100 less per month than we do".

Portuguese
Fulano (from Arabic), Sicrano (unknown etymology), Beltrano (from given name Beltrão) "Fulano, Sicrano e Beltrano" equivalent to "Tom, Dick and Harry"

Russia

Common placeholder first names in Russia are Ivan and Peter, due to their commonality.  Their placeholder function may be seen in  old Russian textbooks: in arithmetical problems or sentences to illustrate grammar.

For a group of average persons or to stress the randomness of a selection, a triple common Russian surnames are used together in the same context: "Ivanov, Petrov, or Sidorov". This is a relatively new phenomenon that was unknown in the early 20th century. Ivanov, being derived from the most common first name, is a placeholder either for s sine arbitrary person. In its plural form, "Ivanovs", it  may be used as a placeholder for a group of people. There is a military joke: The sergeant asks the rookies: "Your surnames!" - "Ivanov!", "Petrov!", "Sidorov!" - "Are you brothers?" - "No, we are namesakes, sir!"

In informal, humorous or ironic contexts, the placeholder  is sometimes used. The surname, derived from the word "pup", meaning "navel", is funny-sounding for a Russian.

In Russian jokes, a placeholder name for an archetypal Jew is Rabinovich.

Spanish
Fulano, from Arabic, Mengano, Zutano. "Fulano, Mengano y Zutano"  equivalent to "Tom, Dick and Harry"

Sweden
 Svensson, medelsvensson describing an average Swede. Svensson being one of the most common surnames in Sweden.

Thailand
 Somchai (common name for male – literally meaning "appropriate for a man"), Somsri (common, if somewhat dated, name for female), Sommai (common names of either gender), nai-gor (นาย ก equivalent to 'Mr. A')

United Kingdom

 Girl next door
 Fred Bloggs or Joe Bloggs
 Joe Public or Jane Public
 John Smith
 Joe Soap
Man on the Clapham omnibus
 Mrs Miggins
 the great unwashed
 the man in the street
 the man on the Clapham omnibus
 the middle class
 Tom, Dick and Harry
 Disgusted of Tunbridge Wells or Outraged of Tunbridge Wells

United States

John Smith
John Doe and Jane Doe
John Q. Public
John Q. Citizen
John Q. Taxpayer
Joe Blow
Joe Sixpack
Tom, Dick and Harry
Average Joe
 Joe Shmoe

See also
Commoner 
 Plebs
Everyman's right

References

Figures of speech
Terms related to an average person
Placeholder names